Diplocephalus is a genus of sheet weavers first described by Philipp Bertkau in 1883.

Species
, it contains 49 widely distributed species and one subspecies.

Diplocephalus algericus Bosmans, 1996
Diplocephalus alpinus (O. Pickard-Cambridge, 1873)
Diplocephalus altimontanus Deltshev, 1984
Diplocephalus arnoi Isaia, 2005
Diplocephalus arvernus Denis, 1948
Diplocephalus barbiger (Roewer, 1955)
Diplocephalus bicephalus (Simon, 1884)
Diplocephalus bicurvatus Bösenberg & Strand, 1906
Diplocephalus bifurcatus Tanasevitch, 1989
Diplocephalus caecus Denis, 1952
Diplocephalus caucasicus Tanasevitch, 1987
Diplocephalus connatus Bertkau, 1889
Diplocephalus c. jacksoni O. Pickard-Cambridge, 1904
Diplocephalus crassilobus (Simon, 1884)
Diplocephalus cristatus (Blackwall, 1833)
Diplocephalus culminicola Simon, 1884
Diplocephalus dentatus Tullgren, 1955
Diplocephalus graecus (O. Pickard-Cambridge, 1873)
Diplocephalus gravidus Strand, 1906
Diplocephalus guidoi Frick & Isaia, 2012
Diplocephalus helleri (L. Koch, 1869)
Diplocephalus hispidulus Saito & Ono, 2001
Diplocephalus hungaricus Kulczyński, 1915
Diplocephalus inanis Tanasevitch, 2014
Diplocephalus komposchi Milasowszky, Bauder & Hepner, 2017
Diplocephalus lancearius (Simon, 1884)
Diplocephalus latifrons (O. Pickard-Cambridge, 1863)
Diplocephalus longicarpus (Simon, 1884)
Diplocephalus lusiscus (Simon, 1872)
Diplocephalus machadoi Bosmans & Cardoso, 2010
Diplocephalus marijae Bosmans, 2010
Diplocephalus marusiki Eskov, 1988
Diplocephalus mirabilis Eskov, 1988
Diplocephalus montaneus Tanasevitch, 1992
Diplocephalus montanus Eskov, 1988
Diplocephalus mystacinus (Simon, 1884)
Diplocephalus parentalis Song & Li, 2010
Diplocephalus pavesii Pesarini, 1996
Diplocephalus permixtus (O. Pickard-Cambridge, 1871)
Diplocephalus picinus (Blackwall, 1841)
Diplocephalus procer (Simon, 1884)
Diplocephalus protuberans (O. Pickard-Cambridge, 1875)
Diplocephalus pseudocrassilobus Gnelitsa, 2006
Diplocephalus pullinus Simon, 1918
Diplocephalus rostratus Schenkel, 1934
Diplocephalus sphagnicola Eskov, 1988
Diplocephalus subrostratus (O. Pickard-Cambridge, 1873)
Diplocephalus tiberinus (Caporiacco, 1936)
Diplocephalus toscanaensis Wunderlich, 2011
Diplocephalus transcaucasicus Tanasevitch, 1990
Diplocephalus turcicus Brignoli, 1972
Diplocephalus uliginosus Eskov, 1988

References

Linyphiidae
Araneomorphae genera
Cosmopolitan spiders